The government of Wanda Vázquez Garced was formed the week following the resignation of Governor Ricardo Rosselló Nevares as a result of the  massive protests resulting from the Telegramgate scandal, and a Supreme Court decision that vacated the office from an invalid occupant.

Background
While the Secretary of State, Luis G. Rivera Marín, would have been the successor, his involvement in the scandal forced his resignation earlier in July 2019. Rosselló Nevares attempted to name a successor in Pedro Pierluisi Urrutia by nominating him for the Secretary of State, but his confirmation was stalled in the 18th Legislative Assembly of Puerto Rico.

The situation led to confusion as Rosselló resigned without a confirmed Secretary of State, who at the same time swore in on his own ceremony, becoming de facto governor. After a week, the Supreme Court of Puerto Rico decided in  that the clear successor was the Secretary of Justice of Puerto Rico, annulled any recognition or vestiges of legitimacy in the week-long Pierluisi government.

Pierluisi vacated the Palace of Santa Catalina at noon of 7 August 2019, and Wanda Vázquez Garced was sworn that day at 5pm as the 13th Constitutional Governor of Puerto Rico. Her New Progressive Party (PNP) had majorities on both chambers of the 18th Legislative Assembly of Puerto Rico and she inherited several cabinet members from the previous government.

Party breakdown
Party breakdown of cabinet members, not including the governor:

The cabinet was composed of members of the PNP and two independents or technical positions (or people whose membership in a party was not clearly ascertained from any available media).

Members of the Cabinet
The Puerto Rican Cabinet is led by the Governor, along with, starting in 1986., the Secretary of Governance. The Cabinet is composed of all members of the Constitutional Council of Secretaries, who are the heads of the  executive departments, along with other Cabinet-level officers who report directly to the Governor of Puerto Rico or to the Secretary of Governance, but who are not heads nor members of  an executive office. All the Cabinet-level officers are at the same bureaucratic level as of the Secretaries

Notes

References

Government of Puerto Rico
Governors of Puerto Rico
Members of the Cabinet of Puerto Rico by session
Cabinet of Puerto Rico